Events from the year 1712 in art.

Events
 August 15 – The new abbey church at Fulda, with its high altar designed by Johann Neudecker and the stuccoist Giovanni Battista Artari, is dedicated by Prince-Abbot Adalbert von Schleifras.
 Charles-André van Loo travels to Rome to study under Benedetto Luti and Pierre Legros.
 Lorenzo Mattielli settles in Vienna.

Paintings
 Rosalba Carriera – Bacchante with a tambourine
 Giuseppe Maria Crespi – The Seven Sacraments series
 Ádám Mányoki – Portrait of Francis II Rákóczi
 Paolo de Matteis – The Choice of Hercules (Ashmolean Museum, Oxford)
 Adriaen van der Werff – The Judgement of Paris

Births
 February 19 – Arthur Devis, English portrait painter, particularly known for his conversation pieces and other such small portraits (died 1787)
 October 5 – Francesco Guardi, Venetian painter of veduta (died 1793)
 October 30 – Christian Wilhelm Ernst Dietrich, German painter (died 1774)
 December 11 – Francesco Algarotti, Italian philosopher and art critic (died 1764)
 date unknown
 Giuseppe Angeli, Italian painter of the late-baroque active mainly in Venice (died 1798)
 John Cleveley the Elder, English marine artist (died 1777)
 Simon Fokke, Dutch designer, etcher, and engraver (died 1784)
 Nicolas Jean Baptiste Poilly, French draftsman and engraver (died 1780)
 Toriyama Sekien, scholar and ukiyo-e artist of Japanese folklore (died 1788)
 Johan Stålbom, Finnish painter who later lived and worked in Sweden (died 1777)
 Stefano Torelli, Italian painter of altar-pieces and ceiling decorations (died 1784)
 probable
 Károly Bebo, Hungarian sculptor, builder and decorator noted for his stucco work (died 1777)

Deaths
 May 30 – Andrea Lanzani, Italian painter for the Habsburg court (born 1645)
 August 23 – Jan Kryštof Liška, Czech Baroque painter (born 1650)
 September 9
 Jan Jiří Heinsch, Czech-German painter of the Baroque style (born 1647)
 Jean Mauger, French medallist (born 1648)
 September 12 – Jan van der Heyden, Dutch painter (born 1637)
 November 26 – Pietro Dandini, Italian painter of the Baroque period active in Florence (born 1646)
 date unknown
 Louis Audran, French engraver (born 1670)
 Andrea Celesti, Venetian painter (born 1637)
 Giovanni Evangelista Draghi, Italian painter of the Baroque period (born 1657)
 Buhurizade Mustafa Itri, Ottoman-Turkish musician, composer, calligrapher, singer and poet (born 1640)
 Francesco Monti (il Brescianino), Italian painter of battle scenes (born 1646)
 Lars Myra, Finnish painter (born unknown)
 Michelangelo Palloni, Italian painter (born 1637)

 
Years of the 18th century in art
1710s in art